Trigonopterus dentipes is a species of flightless weevil in the genus Trigonopterus from Indonesia.

Etymology
The specific name is derived from the Latin words dens, meaning "tooth", and pes, meaning "foot".

Description
Individuals measure 3.04–4.04 mm in length.  The elytra in females are slenderer than in males.  General coloration is black, with rust-colored antennae and dark-rust color on the legs and the basal third of the elytra.  The rust-colored portion of the elytra can range from orange-ish to essentially black.

Range

Phylogeny
T. dentipes is part of the T. dimorphus species group.

References

dentipes
Beetles described in 2014
Beetles of Asia
Insects of Indonesia